Sina Gholampour (born 16 September 1999) is an Iranian swimmer. He competed in the men's 50 metre freestyle event at the 2018 FINA World Swimming Championships (25 m), in Hangzhou, China. In the same year, he also represented Iran at the 2018 Asian Games held in Jakarta, Indonesia.

References

External links
 

1999 births
Living people
Iranian male freestyle swimmers
Sportspeople from Mashhad
Swimmers at the 2018 Asian Games
Asian Games competitors for Iran
21st-century Iranian people
Islamic Solidarity Games competitors for Iran
Islamic Solidarity Games medalists in swimming